All Over the Place is the fifteenth studio album by American jazz guitarist Mike Stern, released on June 19, 2012 through Heads Up International.

Track listing

Personnel
Credits adapted from AllMusic.

 Mike Stern – guitar, nylon string guitar, slide guitar
 Randy Brecker – trumpet
 Bob Franceschini – saxophone
 Kenny Garrett – saxophone
 Bob Malach – saxophone
 Chris Potter – saxophone
 Jim Beard – keyboards
 Anthony Jackson – contrabass guitar
 Leni Stern – guitar
 Victor Bailey – bass guitar
 Richard Bona – bass, vocals
 Dave Holland – double bass
 Tom Kennedy – bass guitar
 Will Lee – bass guitar
 Esperanza Spalding – double bass, vocals
 Victor Wooten – bass guitar
 Keith Carlock – drums
 Lionel Cordew – drums
 Al Foster – drums
 Kimberly Thompson – drums
 Dave Weckl – drums
 Tim Keiper – percussion

Technical personnel
 Jim Beard – engineering, mixing, production
 Phil Magnotti – engineering, mixing
 Richard Bona – engineering
 Dennis Moody – engineering
 Ken Wallace – engineering
 Greg Calbi – mastering
 Max Harper – assistant engineer
 Bob Mallory – assistant engineer
 Jeremy Miller – assistant engineer
 Aki Nishimura – assistant engineer
 Sandrine Lee – cover design, photography

Charts

References

2012 albums
Mike Stern albums
Heads Up International albums